20th Century Masters – The Millennium Collection: The Best of Chanté Moore is a compilation album by American R&B/soul artist Chanté Moore. The album was released in May 2004 by Geffen Records and consists of Moore's songs released between 1992 and 1999 on both Silas and MCA records. The album is part of the 20th Century Masters – The Millennium Collection album series.

Background 
20th Century Masters – The Millennium Collection contains twelve tracks of original material Chanté Moore had recorded for the record labels Silas/MCA between 1992 and 2000. The album features Moore's R&B hit singles "Love's Taken Over", "It's Alright" and the US Billboard Hot 100 top ten hit "Chanté's Got a Man". The compilation album also features the track "I Love You", a duet with R&B singer Keith Washington taken from his 1998 album KW.

Track listing

References

Moore, Chante
2004 greatest hits albums
Geffen Records compilation albums
MCA Records compilation albums
Chanté Moore compilation albums